The 2008 Oregon State Beavers football team represented Oregon State University in the 2008 NCAA Division I FBS football season. The team's head coach was Mike Riley. Home games were played at Reser Stadium in Corvallis, Oregon.

Postseason
After two straight finishes in the top three of the Pacific-10 Conference, Oregon State finished third place to make it three straight finishes in the top three. The Beavers defeated the Pittsburgh Panthers in the 2008 Sun Bowl, extending their streak of 9-win seasons to three.

Schedule

Roster

Game summaries

Stanford

Oregon State was almost able to come back late in the fourth quarter when Darrell Catchings caught the ball just outside the end zone, but it was knocked loose by Taylor Skaufel, resulting in a touchback and victory for the Cardinal.

Penn State

Despite the off-field distractions, the Nittany Lions rolled to a 35-7 halftime lead en route to a 45-14 win in their first-ever meeting with the Beavers. Penn State's sophomore tailback Evan Royster ran for a career-high 141 yards on 17 carries and three touchdowns. Lion quarterback Daryll Clark's 276 total yards of offense (215 yards passing, 61 yards rushing) helped Penn State total 454 yards of offense.

Penn State linebackers Tyrell Sales and NaVorro Bowman both recorded 10 tackles each, both career-highs and linebacker Josh Hull and safety Mark Rubin both made their first career interceptions. 108,159 were in attendance at Happy Valley for this first-ever meeting between the schools.

Hawaii

Oregon State scored 45 unanswered points ien route to their first victory of the season. It was the second time in 3 years that Oregon State has defeated Hawai'i.

USC

The Beavers shocked the college football world as they upset the No. 1 Ranked USC Trojans at home on September 25, 2008. Oregon State is one of two Pac-10 Conference school to have beaten USC twice during the Pete Carroll era.

Freshman Jacquizz Rodgers ran for 186 yards and two touchdowns for OSU, USC quarterback Mark Sanchez passed for 227 yards, and Damian Williams caught 80 yards for the Trojans. 

This was the last time an unranked team defeated a AP No. 1 team until 2021, where unranked Texas A&M upset AP No. 1 Alabama 41-38.

Utah

After five games, the pattern for the 2008 Beavers has been the home team wins.  The Beavers led 28-20 with about 2 minutes remaining in the fourth.  They let Utah drive all the way down the field and score along with a 2-point conversion to tie it up.  The Beavers gave the ball right back to Utah and place kicker Louie Sakoda nailed a 37-yard field goal as time expired.  Sophomore kicker Justin Kahut of Oregon State missed an extra point in the early stages of the game which led Mike Riley to go for the two-point conversion after two of the Beaver's touchdowns.  Both failed and it cost the Beavers the game.

Washington State

During the Beavers blow out of the Cougars, they managed to set a school record for most points in a Pac-10 game.  "Quizz" had 168 yard day as the Cougars lost another quarterback.  Washington State's quarterback problems, along with other difficulties would lead them to a 1-8 season.  The Beavers on the other hand improved their record to 2-1 in the conference.

Washington

The Beavers, led by the two Rodgers brothers, were able to fly by the winless Huskies in dramatic fashion. Jacquizz Rodgers had 93 yards, but the spotlight was on his older brother, James Rodgers who had over 200 yards returning kicks, running, and receiving. The Huskies would go on to lose the rest of their games, as they go winless in conference and non-conference.

Arizona State

After a low-scoring half, the Beavers lead the Sun Devils 7-6 at halftime.  Teams exchanged touchdowns and field goals in the third and fourth quarters.  After Arizona State's last touchdown with 21 seconds remaining, Rudy Carpenter's pass on the two-point conversion was picked off by Victor Butler.  The onside kick was also recovered by the Beavers as they held on to the win, and the undefeated home record.

UCLA

After two field goals by either side in the first half, the teams headed into the locker room at the half in a 3-3 tie.  In the second half, the Beavers blew open the game and ended up only giving up a second Bruin field goal in the second half.  The Beavers blew out the Bruins 34-6

California

Arizona

Oregon

Oregon gained 694 yards on 69 plays, a 10.1 yard per play average. The loss was a Civil War record for points allowed as well as yards allowed, and kept the Beavers from going to the Rose Bowl for the first time since the 1964 season. The loss to Oregon snapped a six-game home winning streak by the Beavers and a two-game winning streak in the Civil War. The Beavers were knocked out of contention for the Rose Bowl, which matched up two of their previous opponents, USC and Penn State. The Beavers finished in the third place in the Pac-10, and went on to win the Sun Bowl by 3-0.

Pittsburgh (2008 Sun Bowl)

The Sun Bowl was played on December 31, 2008 in El Paso, Texas.  Victor Strong-Butler was named the game's MVP.

Rankings

Statistics

Team

Scores by quarter

Offense

Rushing

Passing

Receiving

Defense

Special teams

References

Oregon State
Oregon State Beavers football seasons
Sun Bowl champion seasons
Oregon State Beavers football